Estigmene angustipennis is a moth of the  family Erebidae. It was described by 1855. It is found in South Africa.

References

 Natural History Museum Lepidoptera generic names catalog

Endemic moths of South Africa
Spilosomina
Moths described in 1855